Dan Fallshaw (born 7 March 1973 in Sydney) is an Australian filmmaker, producer, editor and cinematographer best known for the highly controversial documentary Stolen (2009), that uncovers slavery in the Sahrawi refugee camps in south-western Algeria and in Western Sahara.

Dan Fallshaw has lived in London, Munich and Rome. He has an honors degree in Visual Communications from the University of Technology, Sydney and Saint Martin's College in London.

In 2006 Dan began his collaboration with Violeta Ayala on Between the oil and the deep blue sea, a documentary set in Mauritania, about corruption in the oil industry, that follows the investigations of world-renowned mathematician Dr Yahyia Ould Hamidoune against Woodside Petroleum.

He is an alumnus of the Film Independent Documentary Lab, and a Tribeca Film Institute Fellow. Dan won Best Editor at the 2010 Documentary Edge Festival for Stolen

Accolades include Best Feature Doc at the 2010 Pan African Film Festival in Los Angeles, Grand Prix at the 2010 Art of the Document Film Festival in Warsaw, Golden Oosikar Best Doc at the 2010 Anchorage International Film Festival, Best Doc at the 2010 African Film Festival in Nigeria, Audience Award at the 2010 Amnesty International Film Festival in Montreal, Best Film at the 2010 Festival Internacional de Cine de Cuenca in Ecuador and many more.

Filmography
Between The Oil and The Deep Blue Sea (2005, Documentary)
Stolen(2009, Documentary)
Lillie (2011, Documentary)
The Bolivian Case (2012, Documentary)
Cocaine Prison (2013, Documentary)

References

External links

Official website

1973 births
Living people
Australian film editors
Australian film directors
Australian film producers
Australian cinematographers
People from Sydney